Imad Mohammad Deeb Khamis (born 1 August 1961) is a Syrian politician who was Prime Minister of Syria from 2016 to 2020 under President Bashar al-Assad. Previously, he was minister of electricity from 2011 to 2016.

Early life and education
Khamis was born in Saqba near Damascus on 1 August 1961. He earned a degree in electrical engineering from the University of Damascus in 1981.

Career
Khamis was assigned to the management of a number of departments in the General Organization for the distribution and investment power from 1987 to 2005. He was Director General of the General Company for Electricity for the Damascus Governorate from 2005 to 2008. He was appointed Director-General of the Public Corporation for the distribution and investment power in 2008.

On 3 July 2016, Khamis was appointed Prime Minister of Syria, following the 2016 parliamentary election. He was dismissed on 11 June 2020 by President Bashar al-Assad amid a worsening economic crisis and subsequent regional protests.

Sanctions
The European Union sanctioned Khamis due to his alleged role in using electric cuts as a way of repressing Syrian people on 24 March 2012.

Corruption allegations
According to Al Akhbar, Khamis was detained after he was dismissed from premiership, and has been interrogated due to corruption charges. However, Khamis was seen shortly after, when he was voting during the 2020 Syrian parliamentary election.

Personal life
Khamis is married and has three children.

See also
Cabinet of Syria

References

1961 births
Damascus University alumni
Living people
Members of the Regional Command of the Arab Socialist Ba'ath Party – Syria Region
Syrian ministers of electricity
Prime Ministers of Syria
People from Rif Dimashq Governorate
21st-century Syrian politicians